Tennis at the 2009 Pacific Mini Games in Rarotonga was held on September 22, October 01 2009.

Medal summary

Medal table

Medals events

References

2009 in Cook Islands sport
2009 Pacific Mini Games